Lucas Mariano Bareiro (born 8 March 1995) is an Argentine professional footballer who plays as a midfielder for Hapoel Be'er Sheva.

Personal life
In November 2020, Bareiro revealed to the staff at Hapoel Be'er Sheva that his maternal grandmother was Jewish. Bareiro applied shortly after for Israeli citizenship via the Law of Return and received it on 12 January 2021.

Honours
Argentina U-20
South American Youth Football Championship (1): 2015

Hapoel Be'er Sheva
State Cup (1): 2021–22
Super Cup (1): 2022

References

External links

 

1995 births
Living people
Footballers from Buenos Aires
Argentine Jews
Jewish footballers
Argentine footballers
Israeli footballers
Racing Club de Avellaneda footballers
Defensa y Justicia footballers
Club Atlético Huracán footballers
Hapoel Be'er Sheva F.C. players
Argentine Primera División players
Israeli Premier League players
Argentine emigrants to Israel
Association football midfielders
Israeli Jews
Israeli people of Argentine-Jewish descent
Sportspeople of Argentine descent